{{speciesbox
| image = Short-nosed Chameleon (Calumma gastrotaenia) (9646223930).jpg
| image_caption =
| status = LC
| status_system = IUCN3.1
| status_ref =
| genus = Calumma
| species = gastrotaenia
| authority = (Boulenger, 1888)
| range_map = Calumma gastrotaenia distribution.png
| synonyms = *Chamaeleon gastrotaenia
Chamaeleon grandidier}}

The Perinet chameleon (Calumma gastrotaenia), also known as the  Malagasy side-striped chameleon, is a small species of chameleon endemic to humid primary forests, particularly along rivers, in eastern and central Madagascar at elevations between 600 and 1,530 m. It is listed on CITES Appendix II, and as such, trade in the Perinet chameleon is regulated. Exporting the species from Madagascar has been banned since 1995.

Description
Perinet chameleons are small and slender, reaching 15–20 cm, with  elongated heads and bodies. They have smooth, uniformly green, brown or yellow skin with white undersides. A thin stripe runs from their tail bases along the sides of their bodies and across their eyes, and may include white spots. The three subspecies are C. g. andringitraensis with a dorsal crest, C. g. marojezensis. and C. g. guillaumeti''. The male Perinet chameleon is larger than the female and has a bony head crest.

References 
 Perinet chameleon ARKive.com. Accessed 2011-07-30
 Calumma gastrotaenia WAZA.org. Accessed 2011-07-30

Calumma
Endemic fauna of Madagascar
Reptiles of Madagascar
Reptiles described in 1888
Taxa named by George Albert Boulenger